Humanoids from the Deep (2007) is the sixth full-length studio album by DJ? Acucrack and the first to feature no contributions from member Jamie Duffy.

Track listing
 "Abomination Rise" – 3:56
 "Terror Train" – 4:37
 "Meninges" – 5:49
 "Reptilian Race" – 6:19
 "The Speed of Darkness" – 7:17
 "Autodeceiver UK" – 3:47
 "Destroy All Robots" – 7:54
 "Rust Presses" – 4:00
 "Wickerman" – 4:24
 "Iced Ages" – 5:33
 "Belial" – 7:37

Credits
Written, performed, and produced by Jason Novak
Live bass and additional textures on tracks 5, 10, and 11 by Dean Garcia
Backing vocals on track 10 by Kelly Britton
Additional vocals on tracks 1 and 6 by MC Geist

2007 albums
DJ? Acucrack albums